Helena Angelica Gunnarsdotter Klange (born 20 January 1968 in Vallentuna) is a Swedish curler.

At the international level, she was a bronze medallist at the 1988 World Women's Curling Championship.

At the national level, she is a Swedish women's champion curler (1994) and two-time Swedish mixed champion curler (1986, 1996).

In 1996 she was inducted into the Swedish Curling Hall of Fame.

Teams

Women's

Mixed

References

External links

Living people
1968 births
People from Vallentuna Municipality
Swedish female curlers
Swedish curling champions